The National Education Policy of India 2020 (NEP 2020), which was started by the Union Cabinet of India on 29 July 2020, outlines the vision of  new education system of India. The new policy replaces the previous National Policy on Education, 1986. The policy is a comprehensive framework for elementary education to higher education as well as vocational training in both rural and urban India. The policy aims to transform India's education system by 2030.

Shortly after the release of the policy, the government clarified that no one will be forced to study any particular language and that the medium of instruction will not be shifted from English to any regional language. The language policy in NEP is a broad guideline and advisory in nature; and it is up to the states, institutions, and schools to decide on the implementation. Education in India is a Concurrent List subject.

On the 1st August 2022, the Press Information Bureau informed that according to the "Unified District Information System for Education Plus" (UDISE+) 2020-21, 28 languages are to be used in teaching and learning in grades (1-5). The languages are: Assamese, Bengali, Gujarati, Hindi, Kannada, Konkani, Malayalam, Meitei (Manipuri), Marathi, Nepali, Maithili, Odia, Punjabi, Sanskrit, Sindhi, Tamil, Telugu, Urdu, English, Bodo, Khasi, Garo,  Mizo, French, Hmar, Karbi, Santhali, Bhodi, Purgi. new education policy general formula [5+3+3+4] based . New education policy is based on the student and is not dependent on government jobs for starting their own business .the major change of the student is learning one foreign language and choosing the different stream after 8th class .

Background 
The NEP 2020 replaces the National Policy on Education of 1986. In January 2015, a committee under former Cabinet Secretary T. S. R. Subramanian started the consultation process for the New Education Policy. Based on the committee report, in June 2017, the draft NEP was submitted in 2019 by a panel led by former Indian Space Research Organisation (ISRO) chief Krishnaswamy Kasturirangan. The Draft New Education Policy (DNEP) 2019, was later released by Ministry of Human Resource Development, followed by a number of public consultations. The Draft NEP was 484 pages. The Ministry undertook a rigorous consultation process in formulating the draft policy: "Over two lakh suggestions from 2.5 lakh gram panchayats, 6,600 blocks, 6,000 Urban Local Bodies (ULBs), 676 districts were received."

Provisions 
The NEP 2020 enacts numerous changes in India's education policy. It aims to increase state expenditure on education from around 3% to 6% of the GDP as soon as possible.

Languages 
The National Education Policy 2020 has ‘emphasised’ on the use of mother tongue or local language as the medium of instruction till Class 5 while, recommending its continuance till Class 8 and beyond. Sanskrit and foreign languages will also be given emphasis. The Policy recommends that all students will learn three languages in their school under the 'formula'. At least two of the three languages should be native to India. It also states that no language will be imposed on the students.

Shortly after the release of the policy, the government clarified that the language policy in NEP is a broad guideline; and that it was up to the states, institutions and schools to decide the implementation. A more detailed language strategy would be released in the National Curriculum Framework in 2021. Note was also made that there were already institutions which had implemented this language policy 60 years ago such as Sardar Patel Vidyalaya. Both the Education Policy of 1986 and the Right to Education Act, 2009 promoted usage of the mother tongue too as an advisory guideline.

School education 
 Focus on Foundational Literacy and Numeracy : The policy accords the highest priority to achieving Foundational Literacy and Numeracy by all students by Grade 3. The policy states, "The highest priority of the education system will be to achieve universal foundational literacy and numeracy in primary school by 2025. The rest of this Policy will become relevant for our students only if this most basic learning requirement (i.e., reading, writing, and arithmetic at the foundational level) is first achieved. To this end, a National Mission on Foundational Literacy and Numeracy will be set up by the Ministry of Education on priority. Accordingly, all State/UT governments will immediately prepare an implementation plan for attaining universal foundational literacy and numeracy in all primary schools, identifying stage-wise targets and goals to be achieved by 2025, and closely tracking and monitoring progress of the same". Subsequently, the NIPUN Bharat Mission (National Initiative for Proficiency in Reading with Understanding and Numeracy) was launched on 5 July 2021 to achieve this goal.
The "10 + 2" structure will be replaced with "5+3+3+4" model. This will be implemented as follows:
 Foundational Stage: This is further subdivided into two parts: 3 years of preschool or anganwadi, followed by classes 1 and 2 in primary school. This will cover children of ages 3–8 years. The focus of studies will be in activity-based learning.
 Preparatory Stage: Classes 3 to 5, which will cover the ages of 8–10 years. It will gradually introduce subjects like speaking, reading, writing, physical education, languages, art, science and mathematics.
 Middle Stage: Classes 6 to 8, covering children between ages 11 and 13. It will introduce students to the more abstract concepts in subjects of mathematics, sciences, social sciences, arts and humanities.
 Secondary Stage: Classes 9 to 12, covering the ages of 14–18 years. It is again subdivided into two parts: classes 9 and 10 covering the first phase while classes 11 and 12 covering the second phase. These 4 years of study are intended to inculcate multidisciplinary study, coupled with depth and critical thinking. Multiple options of subjects will be provided.
 Instead of exams being held every academic year, school students will only attend three exams, in classes 2, 5 and 8.
 Board exams will be continued to be held for classes 10 and 12 but will be re-designed. Standards for this will be established by an assessment body, PARAKH (Performance Assessment, Review and Analysis of Knowledge for Holistic Development) To make them easier, these exams would be conducted twice a year, with students being offered up to two attempts. The exam itself would have two parts, namely the objective and the descriptive.
 This policy aims at reducing the curriculum load of students and allowing them to be more "inter-disciplinary" and "multi-lingual". One example given was "If a student wants to pursue fashion studies with physics, or if one wants to learn bakery with chemistry, they'll be allowed to do so". Report cards will be "holistic", offering information about the student's skills.
 Coding will be introduced from class 6 and experiential learning will be adopted
 The Midday Meal Scheme will be extended to include breakfasts. More focus will be given to students' health, particularly mental health, through the deployment of counsellors and social workers.

Higher education 
 It proposes a 4-year multi-disciplinary bachelor's degree in an undergraduate programme with multiple exit options. These will include professional and vocational areas and will be implemented as follows:
 A certificate after completing 1 year of study
 A diploma after completing 2 years of study
 A Bachelor's degree after completion of a 3-year programme
 A 4-year multidisciplinary Bachelor's degree (the preferred option)
MPhil (Masters of Philosophy) courses are to be discontinued to align degree education with how it is in Western models.
 A Higher Education Commission of India (HECI) will be set up to regulate higher education. The council's goal will be to increase gross enrollment ratio. The HECI will have 4 verticals:
 National Higher Education Regulatory Council (NHERC), to regulate higher education, including teacher education, while excluding medical and legal education.
 National Accreditation Council (NAC), a "meta-accrediting body".
 Higher Education Grants Council (HEGC), for funding and financing of universities and colleges. This will replace the existing National Council for Teacher Education, All India Council for Technical Education and the University Grants Commission.
 General Education Council (GEC), to frame "graduate attributes", namely the learning outcomes expected. It will also be responsible in framing a National Higher Education Qualification Framework (NHEQF). The National Council for Teacher Education will come under the GEC, as a professional standard setting body (PSSB).
 Other PSSBs will include professional councils such as Veterinary Council of India, Council of Architecture, Indian Council of Agricultural Research and National Council for Vocational Education and Training.
 The National Testing Agency will now be given the additional responsibility of conducting entrance examinations for admissions to universities across the country, in addition to the JEE Main and NEET.
 The policy proposes that higher education institutes like the IITs make changes with regard to the diversity of learning.
 The policy proposes to internationalize education in India. Foreign universities can now set up campuses in India.
 The fees of both private and public universities will be fixed.

International branch campuses 
After a failed attempt to import international branch campuses in 2012, the NEP 2020 renewed the effort by explicitly allowing for foreign universities to establish campuses in India as well as giving permission for IITs to set up campuses overseas. The policy sets a grand goal of utilizing international education to reestablish India as a Vishwa Guru (or world teacher), which was reiterated by India's Vice President, M. Venkaiah Naidu, who expressed a desire to establish India to attract global academic talent. Scholars have raised question about the idea of importing higher education institutions from other questions in order to advance a goal of positioning the country as a world teacher.

Teachers 
The NEP 2020 puts forward many policy changes regarding teachers and teacher education. To become a teacher, a 4-year Bachelor of Education will be the minimum requirement needed by 2030. The teacher recruitment process will also be strengthened and made transparent. The National Council for Teacher Education will frame a National Curriculum Framework for Teacher Education by 2021 and a National Professional Standards for Teachers by 2022.

EdTech 
Under NEP 2020, EdTech companies and startups are provided with necessary guidelines and impetus to develop learning management systems, ERP softwares, assessment platforms, online labs etc. for schools and universities. National Educational Technology Forum (NETF),  an autonomous body is also created to facilitate exchange of ideas on technology usage to improve learning. In September 2021, in line with NEP, NITI Aayog partnered with Byju's to provide free access to its tech-driven learning programmes to engineering aspirants from 112 districts.

Other changes 
Under NEP 2020, numerous new educational institutes, bodies and concepts have been given legislative permission to be formed. These include:

 National Education Commission, headed by the Prime Minister of India
 Academic Bank of Credit, a digital storage of credits earned to help resume education by utilising credits for further education
 National Research Foundation, to improve research and innovation
 Special Education Zones, to focus on the education of underrepresented group in disadvantaged regions
 Gender Inclusion Fund, for assisting the nation in the education of female and transgender children

The policy proposes new language institutions such as the Indian Institute of Translation and Interpretation and the National Institute/ Institutes for Pali, Persian and Prakrit. Other bodies proposed include the National Mission for Mentoring, National Book Promotion Policy, National Mission on Foundational Literacy and Numeracy.

Reception 
Krishnaswamy Kasturirangan, chairperson of the National Education Policy (NEP) drafting panel, commented "No language is being imposed. Multi-lingual flexibility is still the basis for the new NEP 2020". The UGC has asked that awareness about the policy should be spread among students and teachers. Prime Minister Narendra Modi stated that the policy focuses on 'how to think' rather than 'what to think'.

The IIT Kanpur Director, Abhay Karandikar, supported the new policy, while the IIT Delhi director, V. Ramgopal Rao, compared the new education policy with the Morrill Land-Grant Acts of United States and called it a "Morril Moment" for India. The chancellor of Jawaharlal Nehru University (JNU), M. Jagadesh Kumar, as well as the vice-chancellor of JNU called the policy a "positive step forward" while Najma Akhtar, the vice-chancellor of Jamia Milia Islamia, called the policy "ground-breaking". Former Delhi University vice-chancellor Dinesh Singh, said "the policy lays down the road map pretty nicely". Venkaiah Naidu, the Vice President of India, welcomed the policy's flexibility and appreciated its "loftier" goal of bringing out-of-school children into the school system and reducing dropouts.

Lok Sabha MP and Congress leader Shashi Tharoor welcomed the decision but stated his concerns about the implementation of the new policy. A report by the Observer Research Foundation stated the same.

Dhiraj Kumar Nite from Ambedkar University Delhi stated that the removal of the MPhil course was not in harmony with the principles of the NEP, since multiple exit points were offered at the undergraduate level but those interested in a Ph.D. would have no quick exit point, which the MPhil provided. The JNU Student's Union (JNUSU) and Delhi University Teacher's Association criticized the government for approving the policy amidst the COVID-19 pandemic in India, stating that they had opposed the policy since its draft stage. CPI(M) leader Sitaram Yechury alleged that suggestions made by academicians were not taken into account, while the politburo of the party condemned the commercialization encouraged by the policy. Kumkum Roy of the Centre for Historical Studies, JNU, stated that the subjects on the studies of Gender Studies, Media, Environment and Development, Culture, Dalit, Discrimination and Exclusion, and Media have not been mentioned for development. In the study of the Constitution, Fundamental Rights have been left out. President of the DMK, M. K. Stalin, stated that the policy was passed without a discussion in the Parliament and would undermine the Tamil language, due to its "compulsory" option of Sanskrit at every level of education. Aishe Ghosh of the JNUSU tweeted that internships under the policy would lead to child labour.

The Draft NEP of 2019 was criticized for multiple reasons. A social media campaign protested over the inclusion of Hindi in schools in the south Indian states. The Student's Federation of India stated that it threatened the federal character of the educational structure, commercialized education and undermined independent research activity. Madhu Prasad of Frontline pointed out how the draft's merit-based college admissions criteria did not take into account reservations and the caste-based discrimination and oppression faced by many in the country. DP Sharma appreciated the current initiative of end to end transformation of Indian education system but expressed his concerns about the implementation with care and honesty and, connected the self reliant India mission with education transformation.

Multiple-exit option for undergraduate programs gives institutions cover to stop tracking students dropping out due to socio-economic compulsions and instead ignore such instances as individual choice. Prioritizing instructors from private edtech companies over academic professors and online modules over classroom learning has been seen as emphasizing a "mode-for-instruction" framework centered around vocational training and skilling for the masses; with the better "mode-for-learning" reserved for the privileged few through private universities, which are exempt from the regulations related to affirmative action.

Implementation 

 In early August 2021, Karnataka became the first state to issue an order with regard to implementing NEP.
 On 26 th August 2021, Madhya Pradesh implemented NEP 2020.
 Uttar Pradesh Chief Minister Yogi Adityanath said the National Education Policy-2020 will be implemented in phases by 2022.
 The Telangana State government has decided to implement the newly announced National Education Policy 2020 (NEP 2020) in the State.
 Maharashtra CM Uddhav Thackeray directs to appoint experts’ committee for implementation of new education policy.
 Andhra Chief Minister Y.S. Jagan Mohan Reddy has directed officials of the Education Department to implement the National Education Policy 2020 in letter and spirit across the State.
 Rajasthan Governor Kalraj Mishra said that NEP 2020 will be implemented in phased manner.
 The Chief Minister of Assam, Himanta Biswa Sarma said that NEP 2020 will be implemented from 1 April 2022.
 In April 2022, the UGC (University Grants Commission) approved simultaneous dual degrees, both in physical and online modes.
 In October 2022, Ministry of Education released New Curriculum Framework for 3-8 years children and National Credit Framework inline of NEP 2020.

See also
 National Policy on Education

Notes

References

Further reading
 
 
 
Puri, Natasha (30 August 2019). A Review of the National Education Policy of the Government of India - The Need for Data and Dynamism in the 21st Century. SSRN.
 Jeebanlata Salam, Draft National Education Policy (NEP), 2019 and jingoistic nationalism, The People's Chronicle, 27 June 2019.

External links
 
 
 

2020 in India
Education policy in India
Modi administration